is a Japanese surname. Notable people with the surname include:

 Houko Kuwashima (born 1975), Japanese voice actress and singer
 Masami Kuwashima (born 1950), Japanese racing driver

Japanese-language surnames